is a private university in Neyagawa, Osaka, Japan. The predecessor of the school was founded in 1922, and it was chartered as a university in 1975.

Sister Universities
 Taiwan
National Formosa University

External links
 Official website 

Educational institutions established in 1922
Private universities and colleges in Japan
Universities and colleges in Osaka Prefecture
Kansai Collegiate American Football League
1922 establishments in Japan
Neyagawa, Osaka